Artem Lukyanenko (born 30 January 1990) is a Russian decathlete. His personal best score is 7869 points, achieved in 2011. He got bronze medal at 2012 IAAF World Indoor Championships in Istanbul, Turkey.

International competitions

†: Competed only in heat.

References

External links 
 
 All-Athletics profile

1990 births
Living people
Russian decathletes
Russian Athletics Championships winners
World Athletics Indoor Championships medalists